The 2018 elections for the Illinois Senate took place on November 6, 2018 to elect senators from 39 of the state's 59 Senate districts to serve in the 101st General Assembly, with seats apportioned among the states based on the 2010 United States census. Under the Illinois Constitution of 1970, senators are divided into three groups, each group having a two-year term at a different part of the decade between censuses, with the rest of the decade being taken up by two four-year terms. The Democratic Party has held a majority in the Senate since 2003, and gained a net of 3 seats.

The elections for Illinois's 18 congressional districts, Governor, statewide constitutional officers, and all 118 seats in the Illinois House of Representatives were also held on this date.

The Republicans needed to win eight seats in order to become the majority party. However, the Democratic Party picked up three additional seats and increased the party's supermajority to 40 seats.

Overview

Elections by district

District 2
Democrat Omar Aquino has represented the 2nd district since 2016. The 2nd district includes all or parts of Belmont Cragin, Dunning, Hermosa, Humboldt Park, Logan Square, and West Town. On November 27, 2017, Aquino filed to run for reelection.

District 3
Democrat Mattie Hunter has represented the 3rd district since 2003. The 3rd includes Armour Square, Bridgeport, Bronzeville, Chicago Lawn, Douglas, Englewood, Fuller Park, Gage Park, McKinley Park, Near North Side, New City, Washington Park, West Englewood, and Woodlawn On November 27, 2017, Hunter filed to run for reelection.

District 5
Democrat Patricia Van Pelt has represented the 5th district since 2013. The 5th is located in Chicago. On November 30, 2017, Van Pelt filed to run for reelection.

District 6
Democrat John Cullerton, the President of the Illinois Senate, has represented the 6th district since his 1991 appointment to succeed Dawn Clark Netsch who had been elected Illinois Comptroller. The 6th district is centered on Lakeview and Lincoln Park in Chicago. On November 27, 2017, Cullerton filed to run for reelection.

District 8
Democrat Ira Silverstein has represented the 8th district since 1999. The 8th Senate District consists of Forest Glen, North Park and West Ridge in the City of Chicago and its surrounding suburbs of Park Ridge, Morton Grove, Niles, Lincolnwood and Skokie. Silverstein filed to run for reelection on November 27, 2017.

In November 2017, lobbyist and victim's rights advocate Denise Rotheimer testified that Silverstein sexually harassed her while she was lobbying for a bill's passage through Silverstein's committee. Afterwards, several Democratic challengers emerged to run against Silverstein. Ram Villivalam, former political director for Brad Schneider, filed on November 27, 2017. Zehra Quadri, David Zulkey, and Caroline Mcateer-Fournier have also filed to run in the Democratic primary. Villivalam has been endorsed by Congresswoman Jan Schakowsky, Congressman Brad Schneider, State Senator Laura Murphy, and Alderman Ameya Pawar.

On December 29, 2017, it was reported that Senator Silverstein was forty five signatures short of the required 1,000 signatures to be eligible for ballot access in the Democratic primary. Silverstein was ultimately found to have sufficient signatures and remained on the ballot. Villivalam defeated Silverstein in the Democratic primary on March 20, 2018.

District 9
Democrat Daniel Biss has represented 9th district, since January 2013. The 9th district includes all or parts of Evanston, Glencoe, Glenview, Golf, Morton Grove, Northbrook, Northfield, Skokie, Wilmette, and Winnetka. Biss is vacating his Senate seat to run for the Democratic nomination in the 2018 gubernatorial election.

On July 28, 2017, State Representative Laura Fine announced her intention to run for the 9th Senate District. On December 4, 2017, both Fine and her Republican opponent, 2016 congressional candidate Joan McCarthy Lasonde, filed petitions.

District 11
Democrat Martin Sandoval has been a member of the Illinois Senate since 2003. He currently represents the 11th district which includes all or parts of the Chicago neighborhoods of Brighton Park, Clearing, Gage Park, Garfield Ridge, Little Village, and West Lawn and the suburbs of Bedford Park, Burbank, Cicero, Forest View, Lyons, McCook, Stickney, Illinois, Summit, and Riverside. On November 27, 2017, Sandoval filed to run for reelection. No other candidates filed to run.

District 12
Democrat Steven Landek has been a member of the Illinois Senate since his appointment in 2011. He currently represents the 12th district which includes all or parts of Bridgeview, Burbank, Bedford Park, McCook, Brookfield, Riverside, Berwyn, and Cicero.

Landek filed to run for reelection on November 27, 2017. No other candidates filed to run.

District 14
Democrat Emil Jones III has represented the 14th district since 2009. The district includes Washington Heights, Morgan Park, and West Pullman in Chicago as well as the suburbs of Oak Forest, Crestwood, Alsip, Blue Island, Calumet Park, Tinley Park. On November 30, 2017, Emil Jones III filed to run for reelection. No other candidates filed to run.

District 15
Democrat Napoleon Harris has represented the 15th district since 2013. The 15th district stretches from Blue Island in the north, Calumet City in the east, Homewood in the west, Steger in the south, and includes all or parts of Crete-Monee, Dolton, Flossmoor, Glenwood, Thornton, Markham, Midlothian, Oak Forest, Harvey, Riverdale, and South Holland. On December 4, 2017, Harris filed to run for reelection. Terry Brown a Phoenix resident, has filed to challenge Harris in the Democratic primary. No Republican candidates filed to run. Terry Brown was removed from the ballot due to an insufficient number of signatures.

District 17
Democrat Donne Trotter had been a member of the Illinois Senate since 1993. The 17th district includes Burnside, Chatham, Pullman, and South Deering in Chicago and the suburbs of Burnham, Calumet City, Lansing, Ford Heights, Lynwood, Sauk Village, Willowbrook, Beecher, Manteno and Grant Park. On November 27, 2017, Trotter filed to run for reelection. No other candidates filed to run.

Donne Trotter would go on to win his primary not before announcing his retirement on January 19, 2018. Elgie R. Sims, Jr., previously serving the Illinois 34th State House district, was appointed as State Senator on January 26, 2018.

District 18
Democrat Bill Cunningham has represented the 18th district since 2013. The 18th district is split between Chicago and its suburbs. It includes the Beverly, Mount Greenwood and Auburn-Gresham neighborhoods in Chicago as well as the all or parts of the surrounding suburbs of Oak Lawn, Evergreen Park, Chicago Ridge, Hometown and Palos Hills. Orland Park, Orland Hills, Palos Heights, Palos Park, Worth, Oak Lawn, Alsip, Merrionette Park and Evergreen Park.

On November 27, 2017, Cunningham filed to run for reelection. No other candidates filed to run.

District 20
Democrat Iris Martinez has represented the 20th district since 2003. The 20th includes all or parts of Albany Park, Avondale, Belmont Cragin, Hermosa, Old Irving Park, Portage Park and Logan Square. On November 27, 2017, Martinez filed to run for reelection. She is facing a primary challenge from Chicago resident Bart Goldberg.

District 21
Republican Michael Connelly has represented the 21st district since 2013. The 21st district Carol Stream, Lisle, Warrenville, Wheaton, Winfield, West Chicago and Naperville. On November 27, 2017, Connelly filed to run for reelection. Naperville resident Laura Ellman was the sole Democratic candidate.

District 23
The 23rd district spans northern DuPage County and includes all or parts of Addison, Bloomingdale, Bartlett, Carol Stream, Glendale Heights, Hanover Park, Itasca, Villa Park, West Chicago, Wayne and Wood Dale. Democrat Tom Cullerton has represented the district since was first elected to the Illinois Senate in 2012. The 23rd district is the third most Republican seat held by a Democrat. Cullerton has filed to run for reelection. Republican Seth Lewis, Cullerton's 2016 opponent, has filed for a rematch.

District 24
Republican Chris Nybo has represented the 24th district since August 2014. The 47th district includes all or parts of Wheaton, 
Glen Ellyn, Lombard, Elmhurst, Oak Brook, Western Springs, Clarendon Hills, Westmont, Hinsdale, Downers Grove, and Lisle. The 24th was the fourth most Democratic seat held by a Republican. On November 27, 2017, Nybo filed to run for reelection. Nybo's 2014 opponent, Suzy Glowiak, has filed to run as the Democratic nominee.

District 26
Republican Dan McConchie has represented the 26th district since his appointment in April 2016. The 26th district includes Algonquin, Barrington, Cary, Deer Park, Fox River Grove, Hawthorn Woods, Island Lake, Kildeer, Lake Zurich, Libertyville, Long Grove, Mundelein, and Wauconda. On November 27, 2017, McConchie filed to run for reelection. Mundelein resident Tom Georges is the sole Democratic candidate.

District 27
Tom Rooney has represented the 27th district since his September 2016 appointment to replace outgoing Senator Matt Murphy. The 27th district includes parts of Arlington Heights, Barrington, Buffalo Grove, Inverness, Palatine, Wheeling,  Prospect Heights and South Barrington. The 27th is the third most Democratic seat held by a Republican.

On November 27, 2017, Rooney filed to run for retention. Democrats Joe Sonnefeldt and Ann Gillespie have filed to run for the Democratic nomination.

District 29
Democrat Julie Morrison has represented the 29th district since 2013. The 29th district includes all or parts of Arlington Heights, Buffalo Grove, Bannockburn, Deerfield, Glencoe, Glenview, Highland Park, Lake Bluff, Lake Forest, Lincolnshire, Northbrook and North Chicago. On November 27, 2017, Morrison filed to run for reelection. Republican Barrett Davie also filed.

District 30
Democrat Terry Link has represented the 30th district since 1997. The 30th district includes all or part of the municipalities of Beach Park, Buffalo Grove, Green Oaks, Lincolnshire, Mundelein, North Chicago, Riverwoods, Wheeling, Vernon Hills and Waukegan. On November 27, 2017, Link filed to run for reelection. Republican candidate Soojae Lee also filed.

District 32
Republican Pamela Althoff has represented the 32nd District since her appointment in March 2003. The 32nd district includes all or parts of Harvard, Marengo, Woodstock, Bull Valley, Wonder Lake, Illinois, Greenwood, McHenry, Fox Lake, Spring Grove, Johnsburg and Lakemoor.

Althoff has chosen to run for the McHenry County Board instead of seeking reelection to the Illinois Senate. Craig Wilcox and John Reinert, both members of the McHenry County Board, filed to run for the Republican nomination, but Reinert has since withdrawn.  McHenry Township Assessor, is the sole Democratic candidate.

District 33
Republican Karen McConnaughay has represented the 33rd district since 2013. The 33rd district includes all or parts of Geneva, St. Charles, West Dundee, Hampshire, Huntley, Carpentersville, Lake in the Hills and Algonquin. On November 27, 2017, McConnaughay filed to run for reelection. Democratic candidate Nancy Zettler also filed.

McConnaughay would go on to win her primary election but later announce her retirement. She would retire on September 3, 2018. Don DeWitte, former St. Charles, Illinois Mayor and alderman, was then appointed to her seat.

District 35
Republican Dave Syverson has been a member of the Illinois Senate since 1993. He currently represents the 35th district which includes South Beloit, Rockton, Poplar Grove, Cherry Valley, Rockford, Genoa, DeKalb, Sycamore, Cortland, Hinckley, Maple Park, and Campton Hills. On November 27, 2017, Syverson filed to run for reelection. No other candidates filed to run.

District 36
Republican Neil Anderson has represented the 36th district since 2013. The 36th district, located in Western Illinois, includes all or parts of Savanna, Morrison, Sterling, Rock Falls, Port Byron, Hillsdale, Silvis, East Moline, Moline and Coal Valley, Rock Island, Milan, Taylor Ridge and Andalusia. The 36th is the most Democratic seat held by a Republican.

On November 27, 2017, Anderson filed to run for reelection. One week later, Gregg Johnson, former president of AFSCME Local 46, filed to run for the Democratic nomination.

District 38
Republican Sue Rezin has represented the 38th district since her December 2010 appointment. The 38th district includes all or parts of Spring Valley, DePue, Granville, Hennepin, LaSalle, Ottawa, Marseilles, Oglesby, Streator, Plano, Morris, and Minooka. The 38th is the second most Democratic seat held by a Republican. On November 27, 2017, Rezin filed to run for reelection.

District 39
Democrat Don Harmon has represented the 39th district since 2003. The 39th district includes Chicago's Austin neighborhood and the suburbs of Oak Park, Addison, Bensenville, Elmwood Park, Franklin Park, Melrose Park, Northlake, River Grove, Rosemont, Schiller Park, and Stone Park. On November 27, 2017, Harmon filed to run for reelection. No other candidates filed to run.

District 41
Republican John Curran took office in July 2017 after accepting an appointment to replace Senate Minority Leader Christine Radogno who resigned July 1, 2017. The 41st district includes all or parts of Lemont, Indian Head Park, LaGrange, Western Springs, Homer Glen, Burr Ridge, Darien, Downers Grove, Lisle, Willowbrook, Woodridge, Naperville, and Bolingbrook. On November 27, 2017, Curran filed to run for election to his Senate seat. The Democratic candidate is Bridget Fitzgerald, the Village Clerk of Western Springs.

District 42
Democrat Linda Holmes has represented the 42nd District since 2007. The 42nd district includes all or parts of Aurora, Boulder Hill, Montgomery, Naperville, North Aurora and Oswego. On November 27, 2017, Holmes filed to run for reelection. No other candidates filed to run.

District 44
Republican Minority Leader Bill Brady has represented the 44th district since 2003. The 44th includes Tazewell, McLean, Menard, Logan, and Sangamon counties. On November 27, 2017, Brady filed to run for reelection. No other candidates filed to run.

District 45
Republican Tim Bivins has represented the 45th district since 2008. The 45th includes all or parts of Jo Daviess, Stephenson, Carroll, Winnebago, Ogle, Lee, DeKalb and LaSalle counties in northwestern Illinois. On June 12, 2017 Bivins announced he would not seek another term. Republican State Representative Brian W. Stewart is running to succeed him. Li Arellano Jr., the Mayor of Dixon, had planned to run in the Republican primary, but withdrew on December 2 citing his responsibilities outside of politics.

David Simpson, a lumber yard manager, is running as the Democratic candidate.

District 47
Republican Jil Tracy has represented the 47th district since 2017. The 47th includes all of Adams, Brown, Cass, Hancock, Henderson, Mason, McDonough, Schuyler, Warren counties and portions of Fulton and Knox counties. On November 27, 2017, Tracy filed to run for reelection. No other candidates filed to run.

District 48
Democrat Andy Manar has represented the 48th district since 2013. The 48th district includes all or parts of The 48th district includes all or parts of Macon, Sangamon, Christian, Montgomery, Macoupin, and
Madison counties. The 48th is the most Republican seat held by a Democrat. On November 27, 2017, Manar filed to run for reelection. Seth McMillan, Chair of the Christian County Republican Party, and Christopher Hicks, a 2016 candidate for the Illinois House of Representatives, filed to run as Republicans. Hicks was disqualified from the Republican primary ballot after a petition challenge.

District 50
Republican Sam McCann has been a member of the Illinois Senate since 2011. He currently represents the 50th district which includes all or parts of Pike, Calhoun, Greene, Jersey, Macoupin, Morgan, Scott, and Sangamon counties. McCann, a noted opponent of Governor Bruce Rauner, chose not to file for reelection. He had been facing a primary challenge from Steve McClure, an assistant state’s attorney in Sangamon County. Prior to McCann's retirement, McClure has been endorsed by the Sangamon County Republican Party. No Democratic candidate filed to run for the seat.

District 51
Republican Chapin Rose has represented the 51st district since 2013. The 51st district includes all or parts of McLean, DeWitt, Macon, Moultrie, Champaign, Douglas, Edgar, and Shelby counties. On November 27, 2017, Rose filed to run for reelection.

Ben Chapman, a University of Illinois student from Mahomet, attempted to win the Democratic nomination via write-in during the March 20th primary, but failed to clear the write-in vote threshold. He opted not to pursue placement on the ballot via the post-primary slating process.

District 53
Republican Jason Barickman has represented the 53rd district since 2013. He represents the 53rd district which includes all or parts of Ford, Iroquois, Livingston, McLean, Vermilion, and Woodford counties in Central Illinois. On November 27, 2017, Barickman filed to run for reelection. No other candidates filed to run.

District 54
Republican Kyle McCarter was first appointed in February 2009. He represents the 54th district which includes all or parts of Effingham, Fayette, Bond, Clinton, Marion, Madison, Washington, and St. Clair counties in Downstate Illinois.

McCarter has announced he will not seek reelection in 2018. On November 27, 2017, four candidates filed to run in the Republican primary; Greenville University basketball coach George Barber, Clinton County Board member Rafael Him, perennial candidate Jason Plummer, and Marion County Republican Party Chairman Benjamin Stratemeyer. No Democratic candidate filed to run for the seat.

On March 20, 2018, Jason Plummer won the Republican primary. Brian Stout, President of the Vandalia Municipal Airport, was slated by the Democratic Party to be its nominee.

District 56
Democrat Bill Haine was appointed to the Illinois Senate in November 2002. He represents the 56th district which includes all or parts of Alton, Bethalto, Caseyville, Collinsville, East Alton, Edwardsville, Elsah, Fairview Heights, Glen Carbon, Godfrey, Granite City, Hartford, Madison, Maryville, O'Fallon, Pontoon Beach, Roxana, Shiloh, South Roxana, Swansea, and Wood River. On August 16, 2017, Haine announced he would not seek reelection to a sixth term. The 56th is second most Republican seat held by a Democrat. Rachelle Crowe, a prosecutor with the Madison County State's Attorney's Office, was the Democratic nominee.

Edwardsville Mayor Hal Patton filed for the Republican nomination. On March 10, 2018, Hal Patton was removed from the ballot by the Illinois Appellate Court after he signed a petition for Katie Stuart. By signing the petition he had technically affirmed he was a Democrat, despite not identifying with the Democratic Party. This disqualified him from running as a Republican in the 2018 primary or general election. One month later, Patton has relaunched his campaign under the new banner of
Downstate United, a new political party which existed solely to allow Patton to run for office as a partisan candidate rather than an independent candidate, which significantly reduces the barriers to ballot access.

Aud Crowe defeated Patton in the 2018 general election.

District 57
Democratic Majority Leader James Clayborne Jr. was appointed to the Illinois Senate in April 1995. He represents the 57th District, located in the Metro East region includes all or parts of Freeburg, Belleville, East St. Louis, O'Fallon, Madison, Fairview Heights, Shiloh and Scott Air Force Base. On September 21, 2017, Clayborne announced he would not run for reelection in 2018.

On November 27, 2017, shock jock and convicted felon Bob Romanik filed for the Republican nomination. On December 4, 2017, Republicans Dave Barnes, the incumbent St. Clair Township Supervisor, and Tanya Hildenbrand, an Air Force reservist, filed to run for the Republican nomination. The same day, Christopher Belt, the Cahokia School Board President, became the sole Democrat to file for the seat.

On December 11, 2017, Dave Barnes withdrew from the Republican primary. The St. Clair County Republican Party endorsed Hildenbrand, citing Romanik's past racist and sexist comments. Hildenbrand defeated Romanik to become the Republican nominee.

Belt defeated Hildenbrand in the 2018 general election.

District 59
Republican Dale Fowler was first elected in 2016. Fowler represents the 59th district, which includes all of Franklin, Hamilton, Williamson, Saline, Gallatin, Hardin, Pope, Massac, Johnson, Pulaski, and Alexander counties and portions of Union and Jackson counties in Southern Illinois. On November 27, 2017, Fowler filed to run for reelection. Steve Webb, superintendent of Goreville Community Unit School District #1, has been slated as the Democratic nominee and will appear on the ballot if he receives 1,000 valid petition signatures by June 4, 2018.

References

2018 Illinois elections
Illinois Senate
Illinois Senate elections